Brøndbyhallen is an indoor arena located in Brøndby, Denmark, near Copenhagen. The arena holds 4,500 people.

List of significant tournaments hosted 
While primarily used for team handball and concerts, it also hosted:

1978 World Men's Handball Championship
1982 World Figure Skating Championships
1983 IBF World Championships
2014 European Men's Handball Championship

References

External links
Venue homepage

Indoor arenas in Denmark
Buildings and structures in Brøndby Municipality
Buildings and structures in the Capital Region of Denmark
2014 European Men's Handball Championship
Figure skating venues
1999 IBF World Championships
Handball venues in Denmark
Badminton venues